A Maze of Grace is Avalon's second album, released in December 1997.  It contains the hit single "Testify to Love", which has become the group's trademark song, the longest-running Adult Contemporary song in the history of the CCM Update AC chart.  The album was Avalon's first to be certified Gold by the RIAA.  Shortly after the release of the album, Nikki Hassman (now Anders) left the quartet to pursue a solo career with Sony Records.

Track listing

Personnel 

Avalon
 Janna Long – vocals
 Jody McBrayer – vocals
 Nikki Hassman-Anders – vocals
 Michael Passons – vocals

Musicians 
 Tony Miracle – programming (1, 2, 3, 7-10), synthesizers (1, 2, 3, 5, 7-10)
 Charlie Peacock – programming (2, 3, 7), synthesizers (2, 3, 7)
 Dan Muckala – programming (4), synthesizers (4)
 Tim Akers – acoustic piano (5)
 Matt Huesmann – programming (6, 9), synthesizers (6, 9)
 George Cocchini – guitars (1, 9), electric guitar (7)
 Jerry McPherson – guitars (2, 3, 4, 8, 10), electric guitar (7)
 Mark Baldwin – guitars (5)
 Brent Barcus – guitars (6, 9)
 Mark Hill – bass (1, 3, 6, 8)
 Jimmie Lee Sloas – bass (5)
 Steve Brewster – drums (1, 3, 5, 7, 8)
 Chris McHugh – drums (2, 4)
 Aaron Smith – drums (6, 9)
 Tom Howard – string arrangements and conductor (5)
 Carl Gorodetzky – string contractor (5)
 The Nashville String Machine – strings (5)

Production 
 Producer – Charlie Peacock 
 Co-Producer – Chris Harris 
 Executive Producer – Grant Cunningham 
 Engineers – Shane D. Wilson (Tracks 1–6, 8, 9 & 10); Rick Will (Track 7).
 Recording Assistants – Jason Boertje (Tracks 1–6, 8, 9 & 10); Greg Spinner (Track 7).
 Additional Recording – Charlie Peacock 
 Recorded at re:think Studio (Nashville, TN).
 Vocals recorded by Tom Laune at Fun Attic Studio (Franklin, TN) and Wright Studio, assisted by Robert "Void" Capiro.
 Vocal Editing – Matt Huesmann
 Strings recorded by Shane D. Wilson at Sound Emporium (Nashville, TN), assisted by Matt Andrews.
 Tracks 1, 2, 4 & 8 mixed by David Leonard at Starstruck Studios (Nashville, TN), assisted by Scott McCutcheson.
 Tracks 3, 5, 6, 7, 9 & 10 mixed by F. Reid Shippen at Sound Stage Studios (Nashville, TN), assisted by Al Grassmick and Tony Green.
 Mix Coordination – Amy Leonard 
 Mastered by Ken Love at MasterMix (Nashville, TN).
 Production Coordination – PJ Heimmerman and Katy Krippaehne
 Art Direction – Jan Cook
 Design – Torne White
 Creative Direction – Christiév Carothers
 Photography – Paul Elledge
 Grooming and Styling – Kristen Gosset
 Hair and Makeup – Rosemary Tackleberry
 Management – Norman Miller and Glenda McNalley for Proper Management.

Radio Singles
Adonai+
Knockin' On Heaven's Door+
Reason Enough+
Testify to Love+

+ Denotes #1 Radio Hit

References

1997 albums
Avalon (band) albums